Lasdun is a surname. Notable people with the surname include:

 Denys Lasdun (1914–2001), English architect
 James Lasdun (born 1958), English novelist and poet, son of Denys

de:Lasdun